Bullington is a civil parish in the Test Valley district of Hampshire, England. According to the 2001 census the parish had a population of 101.

References

External links

Villages in Hampshire
Test Valley